Chukyo can refer to:

 Emperor Chūkyō (1218-1234), 85th emperor of Japan
the city of Nagoya (中京 Chūkyō). Various things are named after the city:

Chūkyō Industrial Area
Chūkyō Metropolitan Area
Chūkyō Television Broadcasting
Chukyo University
Chukyo Racecourse